The 2nd Royal Bavarian Heavy Cavalry "Archduke Francis Ferdinand of Austria" (Königlich Bayerisches Schwere-Reiter-Regiment „Erzherzog Franz Ferdinand von Österreich-Este“ Nr. 2) were a heavy cavalry regiment of the Royal Bavarian Army. The normal peacetime location of the regiment was Landshut. The regiment was formed in 1815 as a cuirassiers unit and fought in the Austro-Prussian War, the Franco-Prussian War and World War I. The regiment was disbanded in 1919.

See also
List of Imperial German cavalry regiments

References

Regiments of the German Army in World War I
Military units and formations established in 1815
Military units and formations disestablished in 1919
1815 establishments in Bavaria
1919 disestablishments in Germany
Cavalry regiments of the Bavarian Army